The non-marine molluscs of the country of Georgia are a part of the molluscan fauna of Georgia.

Summary table of number of species

Georgia lies in the Caucasus ecoregion, that is a biodiversity hotspot. Georgia has majority of Caucasian endemic species of gastropods.

Freshwater gastropods

Lymnaeidae
 Lymnaea stagnalis (Linnaeus, 1758)
 Galba truncatula (O. F. Müller, 1774)
 Stagnicola palustris (O. F. Müller, 1774)
 Ampullaceana lagotis (Schrank, 1803)
 Radix auricularia (Linnaeus, 1758)
 Peregriana peregra (O. F. Müller, 1774)

Physidae
 Aplexa hypnorum (Linnaeus, 1758)

Planorbidae
 Planorbis planorbis (Linnaeus, 1758)
 Planorbis intermixtus Mousson, 1874
 Armiger crista (Linnaeus, 1758)
 Anisus leucostoma (Millet, 1813)
 Anisus spirorbis (Linnaeus, 1758)
 Bathyomphalus contortus (Linnaeus, 1758)
 Ancylus major Issel, 1865
 Ancylus benoitianus Bourguignat, 1862

Land gastropods
Species of land gastropods of Georgia include:

Cyclophoridae
 Caspicyclotus sieversi (L. Pfeiffer, 1871)

Diplommatinidae
 Toffoletia lederi (O. Boettger, 1881)

Aciculidae
 Acicula limbata Reuss, 1860
 Acicula moussoni O. Boettger, 1879

Cochlostomatidae
 Cochlostoma lederi (O. Boettger, 1881)

Pomatiidae
 Pomatias rivularis (Eichwald, 1829)

Ellobiidae
 Carychium minimum O. F. Müller, 1774
 Carychium schlickumi Strauch, 1977
 Carychium tridentatum (Risso, 1826)

Succineidae
 Oxyloma elegans (Risso, 1826)
 Succinea putris (Linnaeus, 1758)
 Succinella oblonga (Draparnaud, 1801)

Cochlicopidae
 Cochlicopa lubrica (O. F. Müller, 1774)
 Cochlicopa lubricella (Rossmässler, 1834)

Orculidae
 Pilorcula aspinosa Hausdorf, 1996
 Pilorcula pusilla Hausdorf, 1996
 Schileykula batumensis (Retowski, 1889)

Pupillidae
 Gibbulinopsis interrupta (Reinhardt in Martens, 1876) or Pupilla interrupta (Reinhardt in Martens, 1876)
 Pupilla signata (Mousson, 1873)
 Pupilla inops (Reinhardt, 1877)
 Pupilla muscorum (Linnaeus, 1758)
 Pupilla triplicata (Studer, 1820)

Chondrinidae
 Chondrina arcadica (Reinhardt, 1881)
 Granopupa granum (Draparnaud, 1801)

Lauriidae
 Euxinolauria caucasica (L. pfeiffer, 1857)
 Euxinolauria glomerosa Suvorov & Schileyko, 1991
 Euxinolauria honesta Suvorov & Schileyko, 1991
 Euxinolauria nemethi (Hausdorf, 1996)
 Euxinolauria paulinae (Lindholm, 1913)
 Euxinolauria pulchra (Retowski, 1883)
 Euxinolauria rectidentata Schileyko, 1975
 Euxinolauria silicea Schileyko, 1975
 Euxinolauria sinangula Schileyko, 1975
 Euxinolauria superstructa (Mousson, 1876)
 Euxinolauria tenuimarginata (Pilsbry, 1922)
 Euxinolauria zonifera (Pilsbry, 1934)

Vertiginidae
 Vertigo sieversi (O. Boettger, 1879)

Enidae
 Adzharia renschi Hesse, 1933
 Akramowskiella andronakii (Lindholm, 1913)
 Akramowskiella umbrosa (Kobelt, 1902)
 Andronakia catenulata (Lindholm, 1914)
 Caucasicola raddei (Kobelt, 1880) / Ena raddei (Kobelt, 1880)
 Chondrula sunzhica Steklov, 1962
 Clausilioides filifer (Lindholm, 1913)
 Euchondrus acutior (Lindholm, 1922)
 Georginapaeus hohenackeri (L. Pfeiffer, 1848)
 Imparietula brevior (Mousson, 1876)
 Improvisa pupoides (Krynicki, 1833)
 Ljudmilena sieversi (Mousson, 1873)
 Ljudmilena tricolis (Mousson, 1876)
 Peristoma boettgeri (Clessin, 1883)
 Peristoma lanceum Schileyko, 1984
 Pseudochondrula lederi (O. Boettger, 1883)
 Pseudochondrula sinistrosa Kokotschashvili & Schileyko, 1984
 Pseudochondrula tetrodon (Mortillet, 1854)
 Pseudochondrula tuberifera (O. Boettger, 1879)
 Retowskia schlaeflii (Mousson, 1863)

Clausiliidae
 Acrotoma baryshnikovi Likharev & Schileyko, 2007
 Acrotoma claussi Nordsieck, 1977
 Acrotoma gegica Suvorov, 2002
 Acrotoma juliae Suvorov, 2002
 Acrotoma komarowi (O. Boettger, 1881)
 Acrotoma laccata (O. Boettger, 1881)
 Armenica gracillima (Retowski, 1889)
 Armenica griseofusca (Mousson, 1676)
 Armenica unicristata (O. Boettger, 1877)
 Caspiophaedusa perlucens (O. Boettger, 1877)
 Elia derasa (Mousson, 1863)
 Elia ossetica (Mousson, 1863)
 Elia somchetica (L. Pfeiffer, 1846)
 Elia tuschetica Likharev et Lezhawa, 1961
 Euxinastra hamata (O. Boettger, 1888)
 Filosa filosa (Mousson, 1863)
 Kazancia lindholm (Kobelt in Lindholm, 1912)
 Mentissoidea rupicola (Mortillet, 1854)
 Micropontica closta (O. Boettger, 1881)
 Mucronaria acuminata (Mousson, 1876)
 Mucronaria duboisi (Chrapentier, 1852)
 Mucronaria index (Mousson, 1863)
 Mucronaria pleuroptychia (O. Boettger, 1878)
 Mucronaria strauchi (O. Boettger, 1878)
 Pontophaedusa funiculum (Mousson, 1856)
 Pravispira semilamellata (Mousson, 1863)
 Quadriplicata aggesta (O. Boettger, 1879)
 Quadriplicata dipolauchen (O. Boettger, 1881)
 Quadriplicata lederi (O. Boettger, 1879)
 Quadriplicata pumiliformis (O. Boettger, 1881)
 Quadriplicata quadriplicata (A. Schmidt, 1868)
 Quadriplicata subaggesta (Retowski, 1887)
 Scrobifera taurica (L. Pfeiffer, 1848)
 Serrulina sieversi Likharev, 1962
 Serrulinella senghanensis (Germain, 1933)
 Strigileuxina lindholmi (Lindholm, 1912)
 Strigileuxina reuleauxi (O. Boettger, 1887)

Spiraxidae
 Poiretia mingrelica (O. Boettger, 1881)

Oxychilidae
 Conulopolita cavatica (Riedel, 1966)
 Conulopolita raddei (O. Boettger, 1879)
 Conulopolita sieversi (O. Boettgeri, 1879)
 Discoxychilus lindholmi Reidel, 1966
 Oxychilus andronakii (Lindholm, 1914)
 Oxychilus birsteini Tzvetkov, 1940
 Oxychilus crenimargo (Retowskii, 1889)
 Oxychilus decipiens (O. Boettger, 1886)
 Oxychilus difficilis (O. Boettger, 1888)
 Oxychilus discrepans (Retowski, 1889)
 Oxychilus duboisi (Charpentier in Mousson, 1863)
 Oxychilus imperator Reidel, 1966
 Oxychilus Koutaisanus (Mousson, 1863)
 Oxychilus lederi (O. Boettger, 1880)
 Oxychilus oschtenicus (O. Boettger, 1888)
 Oxychilus retowskii (Lindholm, 1914)
 Oxychilus suaneticus (O. Boettgeri, 1883)
 Oxychilus sucinaceus (O. Boettger, 1883)
 Daudebardia nivea Schileyko, 1988
 Inguria wagneri (Rosen, 1911)
 Sieversia heydeni (O. Boettger, 1879)
 Szuchumiella jetschini (A. Wagner, 1895)
 Vitrinoxychilus subsuturalis (O. Boettger, 1888)
 Vitrinoxychilus suturalis (O. Boettger, 1881)

Pristilomatidae
 Vitrea contortula (Krynicki, 1837)
 Vitrea praetermissa Reidel, 1988
 Vitrea rhododendronis Reidel, 1966
 Vitrea sorella (Mousson, 1863)

Vitrinidae
 Trochovitrina lederi (O. Boettger, 1879)

Trigonochlamydidae
 Drilolestes retowskii (O. Boettger, 1884)
 Hyrcanolestes velitaris (Martens, 1880)
 Lesticulus nocturnus Schileyko, 1988 - endemic
 Selenochlamys pallida O. Boettger, 1883
 Trigonochlamys imitatrix O. Boettger, 1881

Boettgerillidae
 Boettgerilla compressa Simroth, 1910
 Boettgerilla pallens Simroth, 1912

Milacidae
 Milax caucasicus Simroth, 1912

Agriolimacidae
 Deroceras bakurianum
 Deroceras osseticum (Simroth, 1901)

Limacidae
 Caucasolimax caucasicus (Simroth, 1898)
 Eumilax brandti (Martens, 1880)
 Eumilax intermittens (O. Boettger, 1883)
 Gigantomilax koenigi (Simroth, 1912)
 Gigantomilax lederi (O. Boettger, 1883)
 Gigantomilax monticola (O. Boettger, 1881)
 Metalimax elegans Simroth, 1901
 Metalimax varius (O. Boettger, 1884)

Hygromiidae
 Caucasigena abchasica (Lindholm, 1927)
 Caucasigena armeniaca (L. Pfeiffer, 1846)
 Caucasigena eichwaldi (L. Pfeiffer, 1846)
 Caucasigena rengarteni Lindholm, 1913
 Caucasigena schaposchnikovi Rosen, 1911
 Caucasigena thalestris (Lindholm, 1927)
 Caucasocressa dasilepida (Mabille, 1881)
 Caucasocressa ibera Hausdorf, 2003
 Caucasocressa joannis (Mortillet, 1854)
 Circassina frutis (L. pfeiffer, 1859) - Circassina frutis frutis, Circassina frutis circassica and Circassina frutis veselyi (subgenus Circassina)
 Circassina pachnodes (O. Boettger, 1884)
 Circassina pergranulata Hausdorf, 2001
 Circassina stephaniae (Hudec & Lezhawa, 1970)
 Euomphalia appeliana (Mousson, 1876)
 Euomphalia aristata (Krynicki, 1836)
 Fruticocampylaea kobiensis (O. Boettger, 1883)
 Fruticocampylaea narzanensis (Krynicki, 1836)
 Kalitinaia crenimargo (L. Pfeiffer, 1848)
 Kalitinaia perspectiva Hausdorf, 1993
 Kalitinaia tiflisiana (Lindholm, 1913)
 Kokotschashvilia eberhardi Schileyko, 1978
 Kokotschashvilia holotricha (O. Boettger, 1884)
 Kokotschashvilia makvalae (Hudec & Lezhawa, 1969)
 Kokotschashvilia tanta Schileyko, 1978
 Monacha (Monacha) cartusiana (O. F. Muller, 1774) - introduced
 Monacha (Paratheba) roseni (Hesse, 1914)
 Monacha (Metatheba) perfrequens (Hesse, 1914)
 Monacha (Metatheba) subcarthusiana (Lindholm, 1913)
 Oscarboettgeria euages (O. Boettger, 1883)
 Platytheba mingrelica (Hesse, 1921)
 Platytheba prometheus (O. Boettger, 1883)
 Shileykoia daghestana (Kobelt, 1877)
 Stenomphalia maiae (Hudec & Lezhava, 1969)
 Stenomphalia selecta (Klika, 1894)
 Teberdina flavolimbata (O. Boettger, 1883)

Helicidae
 Caucasotachea atrolabiata (Krynicki, 1833)
 Caucasotachea calligera (Dubois de Montpereux, 1840)
 Helix goderdziana Mumladze, Tarkhnishvili & Pokryszko, 2008
 Helix buchii (Dubios de Montpereux, 1839)
 Helix albescens Rossmässler, 1839
 Helix lucorum Linnaeus, 1758
 Lindholmia christophi (O. Boettger, 1881) / Caucasotachea christophi (O. Boettger, 1881)
 Lindholmia nordmanni (Mousson, 1854) / Caucasotachea nordmanni (Mousson, 1854)

Bivalvia

Sphaeriidae
 Sphaerium corneum (Linnaeus, 1758)
 Musculium lacustre (O. F. Müller, 1774)
 Pisidium casertanum (Poli, 1791)
 Pisidium subtruncatum Malm, 1855
 Pisidium nitidum Jenyns, 1832
 Pisidium obtusale (Lamarck, 1818)

Hothouse aliens

See also
 — all lists and species.
Lists of freshwater molluscs of surrounding countries:
 List of non-marine molluscs of Iran
 List of non-marine molluscs of Turkey
 List of non-marine molluscs of Azerbaijan

References

Further reading
 Simroth H. (1912). Neue Beiträge zur Kenntnis der kaukasischen Nacktschneckenfauna. St. Petersburg (Russia).
 Georgia's biodiversity database - Mollusca
 Caucasian Land Snails - Checklist

Molluscs
Molluscs

Georgia
Georgia
Georgia